Ian Murdoch may refer to:

a fictional character in the Conan Doyle story The Adventure of the Lion's Mane
Ian Murdoch (general), Australian major general, son of Brigadier Thomas Murdoch (engineer), brother of Air Marshal Sir Alister Murdoch